Idrissia is a primitive genus of the order Stomiiformes, and is an extinct relative of marine hatchetfish and viperfish.  Idrissia'''s position in the order is in doubt, however, as scientists have not studied enough fossil specimens to determine exactly which stomiiforms the genus is most closely related to.

Their fossils are found in regions in northern Africa and Eurasia that correspond to the Tethys Ocean, and range from the Cenomanian epoch of the Cretaceous to the Lower Eocene, when they disappear from the fossil record altogether.

In life, Idrissia'' species would have had a superficial resemblance to a small-eyed lanternfish or a minnow.

References 

Stomiiformes
Ray-finned fish enigmatic taxa
Prehistoric ray-finned fish genera
Late Cretaceous bony fish
Cenomanian genus first appearances
Eocene genus extinctions
Eocene fish
Paleocene fish of Asia
Fossils of Turkmenistan
Paleogene fish of Europe